Since July 2009, Israeli broadcast monitoring service Media Forest has been publishing four rankings which list the top ten most-broadcast Romanian and foreign songs on Romanian radio stations and television channels separately on a weekly basis. The charts consider data from eight radio stations—Digi FM, Europa FM, Kiss FM, Magic FM, Pro FM, Radio ZU, Radio România Actualități and Virgin Radio Romania—as well as five television channels—1 Music Channel, Kiss TV, MTV Romania, UTV Romania and ZU TV. Chart placings are based on the number of times tracks are broadcast, determined by acoustic fingerprinting.

Media Forest also releases year-end charts in regards to the radio airplay, listing the most-broadcast songs of Romanian origin of the respective year, weighted by the official audience numbers provided by Asociația pentru Radio Audiență (Romanian Association for Audience Numbers). The first were "Trika Trika" by Faydee and Antonia (radio) and "Dance Monkey" by Tones and I (television).

"Breaking Me" by Topic and A7S spent 14 weeks as the most-broadcast single on radio stations, the most of any in the 2020s, while in terms of television airplay, this feat was achieved by "Astronaut in the Ocean" by Masked Wolf with a total of 30 weeks. Carla's Dreams had three songs listed as the most-broadcast on radio and television during the 2020s, more than any other act. The charts' current top songs are "Bad Memories" by Meduza and James Carter featuring Elley Duhé and Fast Boy (radio) and "Scumpă foc" by Smiley and Juno (television). In terms of radio airplay, reports by Media Forest indicate that Global Records was the most successful label of 2021. Pro FM was the trendsetting radio station in that year, meaning it broadcast Media Forest's top weekly radio songs the most.

Most-broadcast songs

Radio

Television

Notes

References

Romanian record charts
Number-one singles
Romania Singles
2020s (decade)